Martin Giuffre (born October 5, 1990 in Calgary, Alberta) is a Canadian badminton player. Giuffre has qualified to compete at the 2016 Summer Olympics.

Giuffre, was the Pan American Junior Champion in 2008.

References

1990 births
Living people
Sportspeople from Calgary
Canadian male badminton players
Olympic badminton players of Canada
Badminton players at the 2016 Summer Olympics